Walter Dewey Redman (May 17, 1931 – September 2, 2006) was an American saxophonist who performed free jazz as a bandleader and with Ornette Coleman and Keith Jarrett.

Redman mainly played tenor saxophone, though he occasionally also played alto, the Chinese suona (which he called a musette), and clarinet. His son is saxophonist Joshua Redman.

Biography
Redman was born in Fort Worth, Texas. He attended I.M. Terrell High School, and played in the school band with Ornette Coleman, Prince Lasha, and Charles Moffett. After high school, he briefly enrolled in the electrical engineering program at the Tuskegee Institute in Alabama but became disillusioned with the program and returned home to Texas. In 1953, he earned a bachelor's degree in Industrial Arts from Prairie View Agricultural and Mechanical University. While at Prairie View, he switched from clarinet to alto saxophone, then to tenor. After graduating, he served for two years in the U. S. Army.

After his discharge from the Army, Redman began working on a master's degree in education at the University of North Texas. While working on his degree, he taught music to fifth graders in Bastrop, Texas and worked as a freelance saxophonist at night and weekends in Austin, Texas. In 1957, he graduated in Education with a minor in Industrial Arts. While at North Texas, he did not enroll in any music classes.

In 1959, he moved to San Francisco, resulting in a collaboration with clarinetist Donald Garrett.

Redman was best known for his 1968-1972 collaboration with saxophonist Ornette Coleman, with whom he had performed in his Fort Worth high school marching band. He also played in pianist Keith Jarrett's American Quartet (1971–1976). Jarrett's The Survivors' Suite was voted Jazz Album of the Year by Melody Maker in 1978. In the 1970s Redman formed the quartet Old and New Dreams with Don Cherry, Charlie Haden, and Ed Blackwell. They recorded four albums in the period to 1987.

Redman recorded as a sideman with Paul Motian and Pat Metheny. In 1981 he performed at the Woodstock Jazz Festival for the tenth anniversary of the Creative Music Studio. He was the subject of the award-winning documentary film Dewey Time directed by Daniel Berman (2001).

On February 19 and 21, 2004, he played tenor saxophone as a special guest with Jazz at Lincoln Center in a concert entitled "The Music of Ornette Coleman". Reviewing the performance, Howard Mandell wrote, "Redman, a veteran of Coleman's bands, played on 'Ramblin' and 'Peace', demonstrating more originality, maturity and conviction than anyone else on the bandstand."

Redman died of liver failure in Brooklyn, New York, on September 2, 2006. He is buried at the Calverton National Cemetery in Calverton, Suffolk County, New York.

Discography

As leader
 Look for the Black Star (Freedom, 1966; re-released on Arista Freedom in 1975)
 Tarik (BYG Actuel, 1969)
 The Ear of the Behearer (Impulse!, 1973)
 Coincide (Impulse!, 1974)
 Musics (Galaxy, 1979)
 Soundsigns (Galaxy, 1979)
 Red and Black in Willisau with Ed Blackwell (Black Saint, 1980)
 The Struggle Continues (ECM, 1982)
 Living on the Edge (Black Saint, 1989)
 Choices featuring Joshua Redman (Enja, 1992)
 African Venus featuring Joshua Redman (Evidence, 1994; re-released on Venus in 1998 as "Satin Doll") – recorded in 1992
 In London (Palmetto, 1998) – recorded in 1996
 Momentum Space with Cecil Taylor and Elvin Jones (Verve, 1999) – recorded in 1998

As Old and New Dreams
With Ed Blackwell, Don Cherry and Charlie Haden
 Old and New Dreams (Black Saint, 1976)
 Old and New Dreams (ECM, 1979)
 Playing (ECM, 1980)
 A Tribute to Blackwell (Black Saint, 1987)

As sideman

With Jane Bunnett
 In Dew Time (Dark Light, 1988)
 Radio Guantánamo: Guantánamo Blues Project, Vol. 1 (Blue Note, 2006)

With Ornette Coleman
 New York Is Now! (Blue Note, 1968)
 Love Call (Blue Note, 1968)
 Ornette at 12 (Impulse!, 1968)
 Crisis (Impulse!, 1969)
 Friends and Neighbors: Live at Prince Street (Flying Dutchman, 1970)
 Live in Paris 1971 (Jazz Row, 1971)
 The Belgrade Concert (Jazz Door, 1971)
 Science Fiction (Columbia, 1971)
 Broken Shadows (Columbia, 1971-2 [1982])

With Charlie Haden's Liberation Music Orchestra
 Liberation Music Orchestra (Impulse!, 1970)
 The Ballad of the Fallen (ECM, 1982)
 Dream Keeper (Blue Note, 1990)

With Keith Jarrett
 El Juicio (Atlantic, 1971)
 Birth (Atlantic, 1971)
 Expectations (Columbia, 1972)
 Fort Yawuh (Impulse!, 1973)
 Treasure Island (Impulse!, 1974)
 Death and the Flower (Impulse!, 1974)
 Back Hand (Impulse!, 1974)
 Shades (Impulse!, 1975)
 Mysteries (Impulse!, 1975)
 The Survivors' Suite (ECM, 1976)
 Bop-Be (Impulse!, 1977)
 Eyes of the Heart (ECM, 1979)

With Paul Motian
 Monk in Motian (JMT, 1988)
 Trioism (JMT, 1993)

With Michel Benita
 Preferences (Label Bleu, 1990)
 Soul (Label Bleu, 1993)

With others
Jon Ballantyne, 4tets (Real Artist Works, 2000)
Ed Blackwell, Walls–Bridges (Black Saint, 1992)
Michael Bocian, Reverence (Enja, 1994)
David Bond, The Key of Life (Vineyard, 2009)
Cameron Brown, Here and How! (OmniTone, 1997)
Don Cherry, Relativity Suite (JCOA, 1973)
Anthony Cox, Dark Metals (Polygram, 1991)
Mark Helias, Split Image (Enja, 1984)
Billy Hart, Enchance (Horizon, 1977)
Leroy Jenkins, For Players Only (JCOA, 1975)
Pat Metheny, 80/81 (ECM, 1980)
Roswell Rudd & The Jazz Composer's Orchestra, Numatik Swing Band (JCOA, 1973)
Clifford Thornton & The Jazz Composers Orchestra, The Gardens of Harlem (JCOA, 1975)
Randy Weston, The Spirits of Our Ancestors (Antilles, 1991)
Matt Wilson, As Wave Follows Wave (Palmetto, 1996)
Dane Belany, Motivations (Sahara, 1975)
John Menegon, Search Light (Maki Records 2003)

References
General references

 In Black and White. A guide to magazine articles, newspaper articles, and books concerning Black individuals and groups. Third edition, Supplement. Edited by Mary Mace Spradling. Detroit: Gale Research, 1985
 The Negro Almanac. A reference work on the Afro American. Third edition. Edited by Harry A. Ploski and Warren Marr, II. New York: Bellwether Co., 1976. Later editions published as The African-American Almanac
 The African-American Almanac. Sixth edition. Detroit: Gale Research, 1994. Formerly published as The Negro Almanac
 The African American Almanac. Eighth edition. Detroit: Gale Group, 2000. Formerly published as The Negro Almanac
 The African American Almanac. Ninth edition. Detroit: Gale Group, 2003. Formerly published as The Negro Almanac
 All Music Guide to Jazz. The experts' guide to the best jazz recordings. Second edition. Edited by Michael Erlewine. San Francisco: Miller Freeman Books, 1996
 All Music Guide to Jazz. The definitive guide to jazz music. Fourth edition. Edited by Vladimir Bogdanov, Chris Woodstra and Stephen Thomas Erlewine. San Francisco: Backbeat Books, 2002
 Biography Index. A cumulative index to biographical material in books and magazines. Volume 13: September 1982 – August 1984. New York: H.W. Wilson Co., 1984
 Biography Index. A cumulative index to biographical material in books and magazines. Volume 18: September 1992 – August 1993 New York: H.W. Wilson Co., 1993
 Biography Index. A cumulative index to biographical material in books and magazines. Volume 26: September 2000 – August 2001 New York: H. W. Wilson Co., 2001
 Biography Index. A cumulative index to biographical material in books and magazines. Volume 29: September 2003 – August 2004. New York: H. W. Wilson Co., 2004
 Contemporary Musicians. Profiles of the people in music. Volume 32. Detroit: Gale Group, 2001
 The Encyclopedia of Popular Music. Third edition. Eight volumes. Edited by Colin Larkin. London: MUZE, 1998. Grove's Dictionaries, New York, 1998
 The Illustrated Encyclopedia of Jazz. By Brian Case and Stan Britt. New York: Harmony Books, 1978
 The Negro Almanac. A reference work on the Afro-American. Fourth edition. Compiled and edited by Harry A. Ploski and James Williams. New York: John Wiley & Sons, 1983
 The Negro Almanac. A reference work on the African American. Fifth edition. Detroit: Gale Research, 1989
 The New Grove Dictionary of American Music. Four volumes. Edited by H. Wiley Hitchcock and Stanley Sadie. London: Macmillan Press, 1986
 The New Grove Dictionary of Jazz. First edition. Two volumes. Edited by Barry Kernfeld. London: Macmillan Press, 1988
 The Penguin Encyclopedia of Popular Music. Edited by Donald Clarke. New York: Viking Press, 1989
 Who's Who in America. 42nd edition, 1982–1983. Wilmette, IL: Marquis Who's Who, 1982
 Who's Who in America. 43rd edition, 1984–1985. Wilmette, IL: Marquis Who's Who, 1984
 Baker's Biographical Dictionary of Musicians. Ninth edition. Edited by Laura Kuhn. New York: Schirmer Books, 2001
 The New Grove Dictionary of Jazz. Edited by Barry Kernfeld. New York: St. Martin's Press, 1994
 The New Grove Dictionary of Jazz. Second edition. Three volumes. Edited by Barry Kernfeld. London: Macmillan Publishers, 2002
 ASCAP Biographical Dictionary. Fourth edition. Compiled for the American Society of Composers, Authors and Publishers by Jaques Cattell Press. New York: R.R. Bowker, 1980
 Biographical Dictionary of Afro-American and African Musicians. By Eileen Southern. Westport, CT: Greenwood Press, 1982
 Biographical Dictionary of Jazz. By Charles Eugene Claghorn. Englewood Cliffs, NJ: Prentice Hall, 1982
 The Encyclopedia of Jazz in the Seventies. By Leonard Feather and Ira Gitler. New York: Horizon Press, 1976
 Who's Who in America. 59th edition, 2005. New Providence, NJ: Marquis Who's Who, 2004

Inline citations

External links

"Dewey Redman: The Sound of a Giant", at All About Jazz
"Dewey Redman: an Enduring Original, 1931–2006", obituary in Jazz Police magazine, by Andrea Carter
obituary at The Bad Plus blog
Dewey Redman obituary from All About Jazz

1931 births
2006 deaths
American jazz tenor saxophonists
American male saxophonists
American jazz alto saxophonists
American jazz clarinetists
African-American saxophonists
Free jazz saxophonists
Prairie View A&M University alumni
University of North Texas alumni
People from Fort Worth, Texas
ECM Records artists
Freedom Records artists
Impulse! Records artists
Enja Records artists
Palmetto Records artists
BYG Actuel artists
Galaxy Records artists
Avant-garde jazz saxophonists
United States Army soldiers
20th-century American saxophonists
Jazz musicians from Texas
20th-century American male musicians
American male jazz musicians
Old and New Dreams members
African-American United States Army personnel
20th-century African-American musicians
21st-century African-American people
Deaths from liver failure